John Zamberlin (born February 13, 1956) is an American football coach and former player.  He is the head football coach at Meridian High School in Meridian, Idaho, a position he has held since 2019.  Zamberlin played professionally as a linebacker in the National Football League (NFL) with the New England Patriots from 1979 to 1982 and the Kansas City Chiefs from 1983 to 1983.  He served as the head football coach at Central Washington University from 1997 to 2006 and at Idaho State University from 2007 to 2010.  In 2011, Zamberlin was the defensive tackles coach at Weber State University.  He was the linebackers coach for the Hamilton Tiger-Cats of the Canadian Football League (CFL) from 2012 to 2013.

Head coaching record

References

External links
 

1956 births
Living people
American football linebackers
Central Washington Wildcats football coaches
Eastern Washington Eagles football coaches
Hamilton Tiger-Cats coaches
Idaho State Bengals football coaches
Kansas City Chiefs players
New England Patriots players
Richmond Spiders football coaches
Pacific Lutheran Lutes football players
UMass Minutemen football coaches
Weber State Wildcats football coaches
High school football coaches in Idaho
Coaches of American football from Washington (state)
Players of American football from Tacoma, Washington